Breastagh Ogham Stone (CIIC 010) is an ogham stone and National Monument located in County Mayo, Ireland.

Location

History

The stone is believed to have been erected during the Bronze Age, and the carving added perhaps around AD 550–900.

The ogham stone was found lying in a field in April 1874 by an English tourist, W.K. Dover, and brought to the attention of Sir Samuel Ferguson, who had it re-erected.

Description

Breastagh Ogham Stone is a pillar of stone measuring 366 × 76 × 60 cm and has Ogham carvings incised on two edges.  ("Legescad, son of Corrbrias, son of Ammllogitt") is carved on it. This is believed to refer to a grandson of Amalgaid mac Fiachrae (d. AD 440), King of Connacht of the Uí Fiachrach, who gives his name to the barony of Tirawley and earlier to the túath of (Tír Amhlaidh).

References

National Monuments in County Mayo
Ogham inscriptions
1874 archaeological discoveries